Edita Piekha (Edita Stanislavovna Pyekha) is a Soviet and Russian singer and actress of Polish descent. She was the third popular female singer, after Klavdiya Shulzhenko and Sofia Rotaru, to be named a People's Artist of the USSR (1988).

Edita Piekha is a well known public activist for humanitarian causes, and is a supporter of orphanages in Russia.

Life and career
Edita Piekha was born in Noyelles-sous-Lens, France in 1937 to an ethnic Polish family. Her father was Stanisław Piecha, a mining worker, and her mother was Felicja Korolewska. From 1945 to 1955, Edita Piekha lived in Boguszów, Poland with her mother and stepfather. There, she studied music, sang with a choir, and excelled in Russian at her school, graduating at the top of her class.

In 1955, Piekha moved to Leningrad to study psychology on a state scholarship. From 1955 to 1957, she attended A. A. Zhdanov Leningrad State University (now known as Saint Petersburg State University). There, she met composer and pianist Aleksandr Bronevitsky. Together, they formed the first popular band in Russia, named Druzhba, and gave their first TV performance on New Year's Eve, 31 December 1955, with the Polish song "Autobus czerwony", which became a popular hit in the USSR.

In 1956, Piekha began studying singing and composition at the Leningrad Conservatory. In 1957, the ensemble Druzhba and Edita Piekha won Gold Medal and the First Prize at the 6th World Festival of Youth and Students in Moscow. There, Piekha made history with her performances of the popular hit "Moscow Nights", which she was able to sing in several languages to international audiences from 130 nations. In 1968, she won a gold medal at the IX World Festival of Youth and Students in Sofia with a song "Ogromnoe nebo" ("Tremendous Sky").

Piekha was especially popular among international audiences because of her ability to sing and speak in many languages, such as French, German, Polish and Russian, among others. After the 6th World Festival of Youth and Students, ensemble Druzhba and Piekha released several sold-out records of their songs, eventually becoming one of the most popular bands in the former Soviet Union. In 1972, Piekha and the ensemble Druzhba entertained international audiences at the XX summer Olympics in Munich. In 1976, she formed her own band, and remained one of the popular female singers in the USSR. She also continued performing internationally and toured over 20 countries. Over the years, Piekha made more than 30 concert tours in East Germany alone. Among the highlights of her career were her appearances at Carnegie Hall, New York and at the Paris Olympia.

During the 2000s (decade), Piekha gave several performances on Russian television. She also has been giving annual birthday performances in Saint Petersburg, a popular tradition she has been maintaining for many years.

Piekha has been residing in Saint Petersburg since 1955. Her daughter, Ilona Bronevitskaya, has been a popular singer and actress in Russia. Her grandson, actor and singer Stas Piekha, emerged as one of the winners of the Star Factory show in 2005.

On her 70th birthday, Piekha received an "Anniversary greeting" from the President of Russia, Vladimir Putin, and was decorated with the "Order of Merits" for her lifelong contribution to music and international cultural relations of Russia.

In 2012, British dance group Ultrabeat, recording under the name WTF!, remixed Piekha's "Nash Sosed" and called their version "Da Bop", which rose in the Dutch charts to No. 4, while in the same year "Nash Sosed" was also remixed into a song, "Party People", by DJs Gary Caos and Rico Bernasconi. French singer Daniele Vidal's French and Japanese renditions of "Nash Sosed" were popular in Japan in the 1970s.

Piekha got a star on the Moscow Star Square in 1998. Brooklyn band Svetlana and the Eastern Blokhedz has been paying tribute to Piekha, bringing her music to an American audience that was, until then, mostly unfamiliar with the singer.

Discography

Studio albums
 1964: Эдита Пьеха
 1966: Ансамбль "Дружба" И Эдита (with Дружба)
 1967: Ансамбль «Дружба» И Эдита (with Дружба)
 1972: Эдита Пьеха И Ансамбль «Дружба» (with Дружба)
 1974: Эдита Пьеха
 1980: Эдита Пьеха
 1981: Ни Дня Без Песни
 1983: Улыбнитесь, Люди
 1986: Почувствуй, Догадайся, Позови
 1987: Моим Друзьям
 1989: Возвращайся К Началу
 1994: Я Вас Люблю
 2000: Никогда Любить Не Поздно

Filmography
1989: Muzykalnye Igry - actress, singer
1976: Stazher - actress
1975: Brillianty dlya diktatury proletariata - actress
1973: Incorrigible Liar - self
1970: Sudba rezidenta - actress
1964: Kogda pesnya ne konchaetsya - actress, singer
1956: Masters of entertainment of Leningrad - singer

Recognition
 Order for contribution to Peace and Art (France)
 Honorable Diploma of the All-Russian competition of singers in Sochi (1976)
 Awarded the Nephrite Disc by recording label "Melodiya" as a bestselling recording artist.
 Honoured Artist of the RSFSR (1968)
 People's Artist of RSFSR (1976)
 People's Artist of the USSR (1988)
 Order of Merit for the Fatherland;
3rd class (10 August 2007) - for outstanding contribution to the development of music and many years of creative activity
4th class (30 July 1997) - for outstanding contribution to the development of musical art
 Order of the Red Banner of Labour
 Order of Friendship of Peoples
 Medal "Soldier-Internationalist" (Afghanistan) - for concerts in Afghanistan and the soldiers in the hospitals, from 1979 to 1988.
 Gold Medal and Grand Prize of the 6th World Festival of Youth and Students in Moscow (1957)
 Three Gold Medals in the 9th World Festival of Youth and Students in Sofia (1968)
 Lenin Komsomol Prize (1957)
 Winner of the International Variety Competition in Berlin
 Winner of the "Ovation Award", the "Living Legend" National Award of Russia
 Main award of the international music fair in Cannes
 Personal Star on Star Square at the concert hall "Russia" in Moscow (1998)
 Winner of the Russian National Prize "Ovation" in the field of musical art in the "Masters" (2008)

|-
! colspan="3" style="background: red;" | Ovation
|-

|-

References

External links
 The Official Edita Piekha Site (in Russian):
 Singer Edita Piekha performs a concert on the occasion of her 70th birthday: 
 
 Photo of Edita Piekha from the Rosfoto image collection: 
 PJECHA Edita : 
 Moscow marks 50 years since youth festival: 
 Edita Piekha at iTunes
 

1937 births
Living people
Recipients of the Order "For Merit to the Fatherland", 3rd class
Honored Artists of the RSFSR
French emigrants to the Soviet Union
Recipients of the Lenin Komsomol Prize
People from Pas-de-Calais
Singers from Saint Petersburg
People's Artists of Russia
People's Artists of the USSR
Recipients of the Order of Friendship of Peoples
Soviet women singers
French people of Polish descent
Russian people of Polish descent
Soviet people of Polish descent
Russian contraltos
20th-century Russian women singers
20th-century Russian singers